Leucantigius is a monotypic butterfly genus in the family Lycaenidae. Its only species is Leucantigius atayalica.

The larvae feed on Quercus longinux and Quercus glauca.

Subspecies
L. a. atayalica Taiwan
L. a. unicolor Saigusa, 1993 Fujian
L. a. hainanensis Gu & Wang, 1997 Hainan

References

Theclini
Lycaenidae genera
Monotypic butterfly genera